Daniel Hanford Briggs (born September 27, 1984) is a musician from Erie, Pennsylvania, best known for playing bass guitar for the American progressive metal band Between the Buried and Me.

In addition to his bass duties with Between the Buried and Me, he also plays bass for jazz fusion band Trioscapes and progressive rock band Nova Collective as well as both guitar and bass in the band Orbs. He is a vegan and straight edge.

Dan uses Spector NS-5XL basses with D'Addario EXL160-5 nickel wound strings, a Fender-reissued Sunn 300T amp and an Ampeg SVT-810E.
Dan states that he chose a Spector bass over other basses because he got it at the age of 16 and it was the "nicest bass in my price range." The Spector Bass has stock EMGs and is tuned in C# Standard. Regarding guitar playing, Briggs has stated, "I never use the pick as I learned with my fingers."

References 

American heavy metal bass guitarists
Musicians from Erie, Pennsylvania
1985 births
Living people
Place of birth missing (living people)
Progressive metal bass guitarists
Guitarists from Pennsylvania
American male bass guitarists
Between the Buried and Me members
21st-century American bass guitarists
21st-century American male musicians